Makayla Greenwood is an American taekwondo practitioner. She won the gold medal in the women's bantamweight event at the 2022 World Taekwondo Championships held in Guadalajara, Mexico. She is also a two-time gold medalist in her event at the Pan American Taekwondo Championships.

References

External links
 

Living people
Year of birth missing (living people)
Place of birth missing (living people)
American female taekwondo practitioners
World Taekwondo Championships medalists
Pan American Taekwondo Championships medalists
21st-century American women